Rakshith Gowda also known as Rakksh is an actor from South India, working mainly in Kannada Film Industry. Rakshith is best known for his breakthrough performance of Mahesh Chandra/Mahi in Putta Gowri Maduve. Currently he is starring as Vedanth Vasishta in Gattimela.

Filmography

Television

Films

Awards

|-
! scope="row" | 2016
| Putta Gowri Maduve
| Mane Mecchida Maga
| Anubhanda Awards
| 
| 
| 
|-
! scope="row" | 2017
| Putta Gowri Maduve
| Mane Mecchida Maga
| Anubhanda Awards
| 
| 
| 
|-
! scope="row" | 2019
| Gattimela
| Popular Actor in Lead Role(Male)
| Zee Kutumba Awards
| 
| 
| 
|-
! scope="row" | 2019
| Gattimela
| Favorite Jodi (with Nisha Ravikrishnan)
| Zee Kutumba Awards
| 
| 
|
|-
! scope="row" | 2020
| Gattimela
| Favorite Actor in Lead Role(Male)
| Zee Kutumba Awards
| 
| 
|
|-
! scope="row" | 2020
| Gattimela
| Popular Jodi (with Nisha Ravikrishnan)
| Zee Kutumba Awards
| 
| 
|
|-
! scope="row" | 2021
| Gattimela
| Favorite Actor in Lead Role(Male)
| Zee Kutumba Awards
| 
| 
|
|-
! scope="row" | 2021
| Gattimela
| Popular Jodi (with Nisha Ravikrishnan)
| Zee Kutumba Awards
| 
|}

References

Year of birth missing (living people)
Living people
Indian male television actors
21st-century Indian male actors